Bruce Michael Look (born June 9, 1943) is an American former professional baseball player and catcher who appeared in 59 games played in Major League Baseball as a member of the  Minnesota Twins. He is the younger brother of Dean Look, who played for the Chicago White Sox in 1961, and also played professional football and was a longtime on-field official in the National Football League.

Like his brother, Bruce Look played football and baseball for Michigan State University before serving in the United States Army. He then signed his first pro baseball contract. In 1968, his only MLB season, Look appeared in 41 games in the field, 29 as the Twins' starting catcher, playing behind veteran John Roseboro, like Look a left-handed batter. His 29 big-league hits included four doubles; he had nine runs batted in. Look retired after the 1971 minor league season.

External links 

1943 births
Living people
Arizona Instructional League Dodgers players
Baseball players from Michigan
Binghamton Triplets players
Denver Bears players
Evansville Triplets players
Major League Baseball catchers
Michigan State Spartans baseball players
Michigan State University alumni
Minnesota Twins players
Navegantes del Magallanes players
American expatriate baseball players in Venezuela
St. Petersburg Saints players
Santa Barbara Dodgers players
Spokane Indians players
Sportspeople from Lansing, Michigan
Syracuse Chiefs players